is a multiplatform video game that emphasizes strategy and economic expansion.

Gameplay

Players must keep their corporation profitable by any means possible as a corporate executive. This entire video game is in Japanese; making it mandatory to be able to read the language. Frequent corporate meetings keep players aware of what is happening within the company. It is a sequel to Top Management for the Family Computer and NEC PC-9801. A typical game of Top Management begins in the year 1980.

The NEC PC-9801 version is a more complex version of the game; carrying complex information in addition to a business map of Japan and extra memory to chart the profit margin on a series of bars and graphs.

Starting in the first week of April, players must participate in strategic corporate meetings in order to guide the focus of the company into certain Japanese prefectures. Buying and selling is done on the Tokyo Stock Exchange in order to improve profits for the entire corporation. Employees can be hired, fired, or laid-off during these important meetings.

References

External links
 トップマネジメントII (Top Management II) at superfamicom.jp
 Top Management II at Mercenary Force

1994 video games
Business simulation games
Japan-exclusive video games
Koei games
NEC PC-9801 games
Super Nintendo Entertainment System games
Windows games
Video game sequels
Video games developed in Japan
Video games set in the 1980s
Video games set in Japan
Multiplayer and single-player video games